Morteza Tamadon ( born 1959 in Shahr-e Kord, Iran) is an Iranian politician who served as Governor of Tehran Province from 17 July 2008 to 8 September 2013. He was previously a member of the Parliament from 2004 to 2008.

References

1959 births
Living people
Governors of Tehran Province
Members of the 7th Islamic Consultative Assembly